Lyncina is a genus of sea snails, marine gastropod mollusks in the family Lyocyclidae.

Species
 Lyocyclus aethiopicus Thiele, 1925
 Lyocyclus africaruedae Rubio & Rolán, 2018
 Lyocyclus angularis Rubio & Rolán, 2021
 Lyocyclus circuitus Rubio & Rolán, 2021
 Lyocyclus disjunctionis Rubio & Rolán, 2021
 Lyocyclus dispulsus Rubio & Rolán, 2021
 Lyocyclus distortus Rubio & Rolán, 2021
 Lyocyclus elephantus Rubio & Rolán, 2021
 Lyocyclus fijiensis Rubio & Rolán, 2021
 Lyocyclus funiculatus Rubio & Rolán, 2021
 Lyocyclus glaber Rubio & Rolán, 2021
 Lyocyclus guadeloupensis Rubio & Rolán, 2018
 Lyocyclus horroi Rubio & Rolán, 2021
 Lyocyclus intortus Rubio & Rolán, 2021
 Lyocyclus josemanuelrubioi Rubio & Rolán, 2021
 Lyocyclus juanchii Rubio & Rolán, 2021
 Lyocyclus lamellaris Rubio & Rolán, 2021
 Lyocyclus levilicii Rubio & Rolán, 2021
 Lyocyclus lluviamonzoae Rubio & Rolán, 2018
 Lyocyclus magnioris Rubio & Rolán, 2021
 Lyocyclus mexicanus Rubio & Rolán, 2018
 Lyocyclus micro Rubio & Rolán, 2021
 Lyocyclus microtuber Rubio & Rolán, 2021
 Lyocyclus pernambucensis (R. B. Watson, 1886)
 Lyocyclus protampla Rubio & Rolán, 2021
 Lyocyclus protangulata Rubio & Rolán, 2021
 Lyocyclus roselyae Fernández-Garcés, Rubio & Rolán, 2019
 Lyocyclus separatus Rubio & Rolán, 2021
 Lyocyclus similis Rubio & Rolán, 2021
 Lyocyclus simplex Rubio & Rolán, 2021
 Lyocyclus solutus Thiele, 1925
 Lyocyclus spinosus Thiele, 1925
 Lyocyclus squamosus Rubio & Rolán, 2021
 Lyocyclus tubae Rubio & Rolán, 2021
 Lyocyclus valdesquameus Rubio & Rolán, 2021
 Lyocyclus wareni Rubio & Rolán, 2021
Species brought into synonymy
 Lyocyclus biconcavus Thiele, 1925: synonym of Eudaronia biconcava (Thiele, 1925)
 Lyocyclus orientalis Thiele, 1925: synonym of Adeuomphalus orientalis (Thiele, 1925)

References

 Thiele J. (1925). Gastropoden der Deutschen Tiefsee-Expedition. II Teil. Wissenschaftliche Ergebnisse der Deutschen Tiefsee-Expedition auf dem Dampfer "Valdivia" 1898–1899. 17(2): 35-382, pls 13-46
 Warén A. (1989). New and little known Mollusca from Iceland. Sarsia. 74: 1-28.

External links
 

Lyocyclidae